My Best Enemy may refer to:

 My Best Enemy (2005 film), Chilean/Argentine/Spanish film
 My Best Enemy (2006 film), Italian film
 My Best Enemy (2011 film), Austrian / Luxembourgian film